Events in the year 1841 in Portugal.

Incumbents
Monarch: Mary II
Prime Minister: José Travassos Valdez, 1st Count of Bonfim (until 9 June); Joaquim António de Aguiar

Events
9 June – de Aguiar takes over as Prime Minister after Valdez
15 June – 1841 "Caída da Praia" earthquake.

Arts and entertainment

Sports

Births

24 July – Francisco da Veiga Beirão, politician (died 1916)

Deaths

References

 
1840s in Portugal
Portugal
Years of the 19th century in Portugal
Portugal